Kentucky Route 115 (KY ) is a  state highway in Kentucky. It runs from Pembroke Road at the Tennessee-Kentucky state line in Oak Grove to U.S. Route 68 Alt. at Fairvew via Pembroke.

Route description

A locally maintained road in Montgomery County, Tennessee, becomes KY 115 at the Kentucky-Tennessee state line at Oak Grove. It has a junction with Interstate 24 (I-24) at exit 89 just north of Oak Grove, and then intersects KY 109 just north of that interchange.

It crosses US 41 at Pembroke, and continues northeast to terminate at a junction with U.S. Route 68 Alt. right on the Todd County line in the shadow of the Jefferson Davis Monument.

Major intersections

References

0115
0115
0115